"Victoria" is a song by American rock band Eve 6. It was released February 28, 2012, as the first single from their comeback album  Speak in Code. The song impacted radio on March 20, 2012.

Background
The song premiered February 27, 2012, as their comeback single (Lost & Found was released a month prior as a preview track from the album).

Charts

Release history

References

External links

Eve 6 songs
2012 singles
2011 songs
Songs written by Max Collins (musician)
Fearless Records singles